The Suplacu de Barcău oil field is an oil field located in Suplacu de Barcău, Bihor County. It was discovered in 1956 and developed by Petrom. It began production in 1961 and produces oil. The owning company Petrom will invest €200 million in the redevelopment of the Suplacu de Barcău oil field and a further 70 million barrels (10.24×106tonnes) of oil will be made available thus increasing the total reserves at 310 million barrels (29.26×106tonnes).

References

Oil fields in Romania
1956 establishments in Romania